The 2000 UNCAF Interclub Cup was the 18th edition of the Central American Club Championship, and the second under the name UNCAF Interclub Cup.  The tournament was organized by UNCAF, the football regional body in Central America.

Honduran club Olimpia won the final round to obtain their third tournament in team's history.  The tournament also served as a qualification to the 2000 CONCACAF Champions' Cup.

First round

Group 1

Group 2

Group 3

Group 4

 La Victoria did not show, Olimpia was awarded the win

Second round

Group A

Group B

Final round

Final Group

 Olimpia, Alajuelense, and Real España qualify to CONCACAF Champions' Cup 2000

References

UNCAF Interclub Cup
1
1999–2000 in Honduran football
1999–2000 in Salvadoran football
1999–2000 in Guatemalan football
1999–2000 in Costa Rican football
1999–2000 in Belizean football
1999–2000 in Nicaraguan football
2000–01 in Honduran football
2000–01 in Salvadoran football
2000–01 in Guatemalan football
2000–01 in Costa Rican football
2000–01 in Belizean football
2000–01 in Nicaraguan football
1999–2000 in Panamanian football
2000–01 in Panamanian football